= Development Planning Association of South Africa =

The Development Planning Association of South Africa (DPASA) was a professional town planning institute formed by South African planners critical of apartheid prejudice within the South African Institute of Town and Regional Planners. The DPASA was founded in January 1994.

In 1996, however, both the South African Institute of Town and Regional Planners and Development Planning Association gave way to the South African Planning Institute. This new institute incorporated within its objectives that showed clear support for the values of post-apartheid South Africa, and the SAITRP was dissolved.
