= South African Planning Institute =

South African institute

The South African Planning Institute was formed on 1 July 1996 following the amalgamation of the South African Institute of Town and Regional Planners and the Development Planning Association of South Africa.

Its purpose is:

"to enhance the art and science of sustainable local, regional and national human and physical development planning, and the theory and practise relating thereto."

The South African Planning Institute has regional branches in Gauteng, Eastern Cape, Free State, Mpumalanga, Kwazulu-Natal, North West, Western Cape, Northern Cape and Limpopo.

Christine Platt served the institute as president until her recent appointment as president of the Commonwealth Association of Planners.
